Ferddy Roca (born 24 March 2000) is a Bolivian football player who plays as forward for Marbella on loan from Oriente Petrolero.

In September 2020, Sanchez along with club teammates Hector Sanchez and Mateo Zoch left the national team squad by order of their club Oriente Petrolero president Ronald Raldes.

References

2000 births
Living people
Sportspeople from Santa Cruz de la Sierra
Bolivian footballers
Association football forwards
Bolivian Primera División players
Oriente Petrolero players
Segunda División B players
Marbella FC players
Bolivian expatriate footballers
Bolivian expatriate sportspeople in Spain
Expatriate footballers in Spain